Beyond is a three issue series from Virgin Comics. It was created by Deepak Chopra and written by Ron Marz with art by Edison George and is being adapted from a screenplay written by Chopra.

Plot 
The solicit described the series as "Chopra's original story of an American businessman who is propelled across dimensions and into an adventure like no other. While traveling in India with his family, his wife disappears, he will stop at nothing - and go literally anywhere - to save her." The following issue will continue the journey of Michael (the protagonist) in his search for his wife Anna.

Production
The series was planned to run 4 issues in its debut arc  but only 3 issues were published, leaving the continuing storyline incomplete.

Release
Launched in late May 2008

Movie adaptation
Suri Krishnamma will direct the film adaptation of the supernatural thriller comic, the screenplay is currently in works from Deepak Chopra. It will produce by Gotham Chopra and Sharad Devarajan and as executive producers works John Garland and Michael Dufficy.

Notes

2008 comics debuts
Virgin Comics titles